is a comedy manga serialized in ASCII Media Works’ Weekly ASCII and Ubuntu Magazine Japan between May 2008 and June 2013. Its name is a play on words combining the Linux distribution Ubuntu and a Japanese onomatopoeia for a kiss, .

Plot 

The story follows the activities of the three members of the Ichinomiya Prefectural High School’s system administration club (part of the wider IT club). Each chapter is focussed on a certain aspect of the Ubuntu operating system or a related topic, such as command-line interfaces, input methods, Linux Mint, or software licensing.

Characters 

President of the system administration club, Akane is a *nix evangelist and very knowledgeable about network and Linux system administration.

Vice-president of the system administration club, Masato is a Windows user and very versed in internet culture.

The system administration club’s only regular member, Risa is a Mac user and not very skilled with computers except for media design.

President of the computer science club, Akiha is in part responsible for the school’s IT equipment and generally opposed to  FLOSS solutions.

Release 

Besides print publication in ASCII Media Works’ magazines, most of the manga's chapters are freely available online and released under a Creative Commons license. Furthermore, a tankōbon was published in 2012 containing the first eight chapters as well as two short extra stories.

Because of its release under a permissive license allowing use in derivative works, Ubunchu! has been translated to at least 17 different languages by fans.

External links 
Official manga website 
English translations (chapters 1–9)
English translations (chapters 9-14)

References 

Comedy anime and manga